Michael Cobley (born 10 October 1959) is a British science fiction and fantasy author from Glasgow.

Life
Michael Cobley was born in Leicester but moved to Glasgow at the age of seven. While studying engineering at the University of Strathclyde, he used to work as a DJ; at the same time, he wrote rants for the University paper under the pen-name of "Phaedrus".

He has published five novels, a collection of short stories and several reviews and essays.

Writing
Cobley, who is a member of the Glasgow Science Fiction Writers Circle, said he was influenced by writers such as Frank Herbert, David Brin, Iain Banks, Ken MacLeod and Vernor Vinge, but also by music (Dmitri Shostakovich, Yes, Blue Öyster Cult, Emerson, Lake & Palmer and Monster Magnet) and TV shows (Firefly, Babylon 5, the most recent series of Battlestar Galactica).

Cobley published his first novel, Shadowkings, in 2001 for Earthlight, an imprint of Simon & Schuster. He completed the "Shadowkings" trilogy with Shadowgod (2003) and Shadowmasque (2005), which was nominated for the British Fantasy Society's best novel award. Cobley then began writing a space opera series, "Humanity's Fire". It encompasses five novels as of 2018. The first volume, Seeds of Earth, was published in 2009 by Orbit Books.

Bibliography

Novels

Shadowkings trilogy
 Shadowkings. London: Earthlight, 2001 (paper). 
 Shadowgod. London: Earthlight, 2003 (paper). 
 Shadowmasque. London: Simon & Schuster, 2005 (paper).

Humanity's Fire
All published as paperbacks by Orbit Books in London.
 Seeds Of Earth, 2009. 
 The Orphaned Worlds, 2010. 
 The Ascendant Stars, 2011. 
 Ancestral Machines, 2016. 
 Splintered Suns, 2018.

Collections
 Iron Mosaic. Stafford: Immanion Press, 2004.

References

External links
 

Living people
1959 births
Members of the Glasgow Science Fiction Writers' Circle
Scottish science fiction writers
Alumni of the University of Strathclyde
People from Leicester
Writers from Glasgow
Scottish male novelists